The  Green Bay Packers season was their 14th season overall and their 12th in the National Football League. The team finished with a 10–3–1 record under founder and head coach Curly Lambeau, earning them a second-place finish despite winning three more games than the champion Chicago Bears.

The Bears and Portsmouth Spartans were tied for first at the end of the season and played an extra game; the winner was the league champion and the loser finished in third in the standings. The game was played indoors on a shortened field and the Bears won, 9–0. Entering December, the Packers were 10–1–1, but were shut out on the road by both Portsmouth and the Bears to close out the season; Green Bay had defeated both teams in October.

In , the NFL divided into two divisions and began an annual NFL championship game to decide the league's crown.

Schedule

Standings

References
Sportsencyclopedia.com

Green Bay Packers seasons
Green Bay Packers
Green Bay Packers